What Did I Do to Deserve This My Lord!? 2 (formerly known as Holy Invasion of Privacy, Badman! 2: Time to Tighten Up Security!, known as Yūsha no Kuse ni Namaiki da or2, 勇者のくせになまいきだor2, literally "For a hero, [you are] quite impudent/cheeky/bold] 2)" in Japan) is a real-time strategy/god game for the PlayStation Portable. It is the sequel to What Did I Do to Deserve This, My Lord?.

The game was released in Japan in 2008, and was announced for a North American release during Tokyo Game Show 2009. This release was delayed until May 4, 2010, due to NIS America changing the game's name from Holy Invasion Of Privacy, Badman! 2: Time to Tighten Up Security! to What Did I Do to Deserve This, My Lord!? 2 to avoid conflict with the Batman license. The UMD release includes the first game.

Gameplay 
The gameplay is almost identical to the first game, with a few different additions and changes. These  include 'Mutation' (monsters can mutate in three forms: by deformity, by obesity and by gigantism) and 'The Overlord's Chamber', where you can grow monsters and observe their evolution.
What Did I Do to Deserve This, My Lord!? 2 contains "4 times more stages, 3.3 times more monsters and 2.3 times more heroes" than the first game.

References

External links
 Official website

2008 video games
God games
PlayStation Portable games
PlayStation Portable-only games
Real-time strategy video games
Sony Interactive Entertainment games
Video game sequels
Video games developed in Japan
Acquire (company) games
Single-player video games
Nippon Ichi Software games